Penal may refer to:
Penal colony
Penal system, prisons
Penal military unit
Penal (town), Trinidad and Tobago

See also
Penile, to do with the penis